"Let Me In" is the name of a 1961 song with music and lyrics by Yvonne Baker, recorded the same year by Baker and The Sensations, which went to No. 2 on the US R&B singles chart and No. 4 on the U.S. Billboard Hot 100 singles chart. It was the group's highest charting and most successful single.  "Let Me In" may be most memorable for its repetitive "weeoo" refrain in the chorus.

Cover versions
The song was covered by Bonnie Raitt on her 1973 album Takin' My Time.

In popular culture
The song was used in the 2003 movie Secondhand Lions.
The song was used in a Cadillac television commercial in 2018.

References

1961 singles
1961 songs